Drillia tripter is a species of sea snail, a marine gastropod mollusk in the family Drilliidae.

Description
The light violaceous shell has a wide and shallow anal sinus. The length of the shell varies between 11 mm and 23 mm.

Distribution
This species occurs in the demersal zone of the Atlantic Ocean off West Africa (Senegal, Ghana)

References

  Tucker, J.K. 2004 Catalog of recent and fossil turrids (Mollusca: Gastropoda). Zootaxa 682:1–1295

External links
 

tripter
Gastropods described in 1883